Veronika Macarol (born 28 March 1987) is a Slovenian competitive sailor. She competed in the 470 class at the 2016 Summer Olympics in Rio de Janeiro, together with Tina Mrak.

References

External links
 
 
 

1987 births
Living people
Slovenian female sailors (sport)
Olympic sailors of Slovenia
Sailors at the 2016 Summer Olympics – 470
Sportspeople from Koper
Sailors at the 2020 Summer Olympics – 470
21st-century Slovenian women